Mysuru–Renigunta Express is an Weekly Express Train which runs Between the Mysore & Renigunta section which comes under the South Western Railway zone in Karnataka, Tamil Nadu & Andhra Pradesh State in India. It is an Important connectivity for commuters of Mysuru (Mysore) and Renigunta.

Overview
Mysuru–Renigunta Express was officially started by South Western Railway on 1 June 2018, for connecting the Southern parts of Karnataka and Andhra Pradesh and increasing frequency for Mysuru (Mysore) and Renigunta Route.

Routes
This train passes through KSR Bengaluru City,  &  on both sides.

Traction
As the route is fully electrified, the WAP 7 and WAP 4 loco pulls the train to its destination.

References

Express trains in India
Rail transport in Karnataka
Rail transport in Tamil Nadu
Rail transport in Andhra Pradesh
Transport in Mysore